Thambetolepis is a dubious genus of sachitid halkieriid from the Cambrian (530-513 Ma). The genus Sinosachites may have been the same as Thambetolepis.

The sclerites of Sinosachites are probably synonymous with Thambetolepis, which was originally described from Australia.
Left-hand and right-hand sclerites exist, so the animal was bilaterally symmetrical; as in Halkieria, palmate, cultrate and siculate sclerite morphologies exist.  The chambers are the same diameter, ~40 µm, as the longitudinal canals in Australohalkieria; their greater number and arrangement as lateral rather than longitudinal bodies reflects the greater size of the Sinosachites sclerites, which measure about 1–2 mm in length.

References

Extinct molluscs
Nomina dubia